Sweet Revenge is a 1998 British black comedy film written and directed by Malcolm Mowbray. The screenplay is based on the epic two-part play The Revengers' Comedies by Alan Ayckbourn.

The film had a brief and modestly successful theatrical run in Italy under the title Amori e vendette (Loves and Vendettas) but failed to find a distributor elsewhere. It eventually was telecast in the UK by BBC Two on 30 December 1999, under the title The Revengers' Comedies. It was released on videotape in the United States and France and on DVD in the US.

Plot
Conservative Henry Bell has been eased out of his job by condescending Bruce Tick, while wealthy and wildly eccentric Karen Knightly has been abandoned by her lover Anthony Staxton-Billing, who opted to return to his wife Imogen. Both are intent on committing suicide by leaping from the Tower Bridge in London. When neither succeeds, they strike a bargain whereby each agrees to exact revenge on behalf of the other, although Henry is less enthusiastic about the plan.

Karen, disguised as a frumpy office temp, finds employment as an assistant to Tick and quickly derails his marriage by leading his wife Hilary to believe he's involved in an extramarital affair. Henry, meanwhile, is finding it difficult to keep his end of the bargain, since he has fallen in love with Imogen, the object of Karen's revenge. Instead of planning her demise, he begins an affair with the beguiling woman. Henry learns that Anthony left Karen not for Imogen, but for beautician Daphne Teal, and he begins to suspect Karen is more of a villain than a victim. The woman proves to be a formidable foe when she realizes Henry may renege on their deal.

Adding to the humorous complications are Karen's oddball brother Oliver, who delights in racing through the interior of their rural mansion on his motor scooter; elderly and slightly befuddled housekeeper Winnie; and Daphne's very inept daughter Norma, who's being groomed to take over the household chores so Winnie finally can retire.

Cast
 Sam Neill as Henry Bell
 Helena Bonham Carter as Karen Knightly
 Kristin Scott Thomas as Imogen Staxton-Billing
 Rupert Graves as Oliver Knightly
 Martin Clunes as Anthony Staxton-Billing
 Steve Coogan as Bruce Tick
 Liz Smith as Winnie
 Charlotte Coleman as Norma
 Anita Dobson as Daphne Teal
 John Wood as Col. Marcus
 David Dineen as Sneering Truck Driver

Production

Rural scenes were filmed in Weston Turville in Buckinghamshire. Interiors were filmed at the Twickenham Film Studios in London.

Reception

David Rooney of Variety called the film a "mix of dry British wit, sophisticated farce and arch eccentricity," "the kind of material that can sparkle onstage but often sits uneasily onscreen, and tends to have limited pull with today's audiences." He added, "Aside from its humor, Ayckbourn's work is notable for its brisk pacing, multilateral action and the ingenuity of its complex structuring, all qualities that lose something in the screen transfer...Mowbray's script opens out the action physically but is unable to shake off the stagy feel. To his credit, he never shies away from the savagery that flavors the best black comedies, but the verve needed to make this one a complete success is nonetheless missing." 
MaryAnn Johanson  of FlickFilosopher.com gave it 9 out of 10 and called it "a delicious example of British humor that manages to be both over the top and understated at the same time. A must for fans of cheeky, topsy-turvy comedy.
Entertainment Weekly gave it a B− grade.

References

External links
 
 
 

1998 films
1998 comedy films
British comedy films
British films about revenge
Films directed by Malcolm Mowbray
British films based on plays
Films scored by Alexandre Desplat
1990s English-language films
1990s British films